The Puerto Rico Bureau of Forensic Science is the sole medical examiner of Puerto Rico and its municipalities. The bureau is headquartered in San Juan. The agency changed its name in April 2017 when governor Ricardo Rosselló signed into law the unification of the law enforcement and emergency service agencies of Puerto Rico into the Department of Public Safety. The agency was part of the umbrella organization for three years until Wanda Vázquez Garced signed legislation making the agency once again a separate entity.

The current director of the bureau is Doctor María Conte Miller who was appointed by governor Wanda Vazquez Garced on October 8, 2019.

References

External links
 Official website 

Crime in Puerto Rico
Forensic government agencies
State law enforcement agencies of Puerto Rico